Enrique Molina (25 July 1919 – 10 May 1998) was an Argentine cyclist. He competed in the team pursuit event at the 1948 Summer Olympics.

References

External links
 

1919 births
1998 deaths
Argentine male cyclists
Olympic cyclists of Argentina
Cyclists at the 1948 Summer Olympics
Place of birth missing